Bartók is a crater on Mercury.  Its name was adopted by the International Astronomical Union (IAU) in 1979. Bartók is named for the Hungarian composer Béla Bartók, who lived from 1881 to 1945.

Bartók is the largest crater of the Kuiperian system on Mercury, at 118 km diameter.  It is followed by Amaral crater.

Within the central peak complex of Bartók is a dark spot of low reflectance material (LRM).  Dark spots are associated with hollows.  

To the northeast of Bartók is the large basin Beethoven.  The crater Vālmiki is to the northwest of Bartók, and Gogol is to the west.

Views

References

Impact craters on Mercury